This list ranks the tallest externally complete buildings and structures in Dublin, Ireland which stand over 50m tall.

As of June 2021 there are 6 structures over 80 m (260 ft) tall and 7 buildings over 50 m (164 ft) tall.
Dublin's tallest structure is Poolbeg power station chimney 2 which is 207.8 m (682 ft) tall while Dublin's tallest building is Capital Dock which is 79 m (259 ft) tall.

List of tallest habitable buildings in Dublin 
This list ranks habitable buildings in Dublin that stand more than 50 m (164 ft) tall, based on height by highest architectural feature.

List of tallest churches in Dublin

List of tallest structures in Dublin

List of proposed buildings

List of unbuilt buildings

See also 
 List of tallest structures in Ireland
 List of tallest buildings in Ireland

References 

 
Tallest, Dublin